Pearl and Marina are a pair of interconnected characters from the Splatoon video game series.
who perform a variety of songs which is utilized as in-game music. The characters are also used by the developers to convey content updates and announcements to players of Splatoon 2. 

Pearl and Marina are voiced by voice actresses Rina Itou and Alice Peralta, respectively. They perform both the spoken dialogue as well as the tracks that their characters sing through a voice changer effect. Both characters have received a generally positive reception, with some critics identifying them as key elements of Splatoon 2 which drew significant fan interest.

Concept and design
Pearl's full Japanese name is revealed to be  in the Octotune Soundtrack booklet. Within the fictional Splatoon universe, Pearl and Marina are members of two species of sentient humanoid cephalopods: Pearl, an Inkling, is 21 while Marina, an Octoling, is 18.

Before the duo's character designs were finalized, Pearl was originally designed as an Octoling, which gives off more of a similarity to Callie and Marie of the Squid Sisters. She was later redesigned as an Inkling and was made shorter to contrast said similarities.

They were designed by Nintendo artist Rina Honda.

History

Splatoon 2

According to the game's lore, Pearl and Marina both had separate lives until sometime between the events of the first Splatoon and Splatoon 2. Pearl was born from a rich family and had a strong interest in music at a young age. Similar to Callie and Marie, she took part of the Inkopolis Youth-folk Singing Contest, however she caused damage to the venue through the power of her voice. Later on her life, Pearl would start up her music career, with her first genre being death metal, helping her garner a small fan base.

Marina, also at a prodigious age, was assigned as combat engineer for the Octarian race, under the direction of DJ Octavio and soon became a high-ranking member of her society. During the events of the final boss in the original Splatoon, Marina was an observer of Agent 3's battle against DJ Octavio. She soon deserted her race after hearing the Squid Sisters' song, Calamari Inkantation, saying: "This changes everything."

Marina and Pearl both met each other on Mt. Nantai, with Marina having no knowledge of the Inkling culture and language, which Pearl helped her to learn. The next time they met, Marina showed Pearl her musical abilities by letting her listen to an early demo of a song she had made, Ebb and Flow. Pearl was instantly convinced and they both formed Off the Hook. By their fourth single, the duo became so popular that they soon hosted Inkopolis News after the Squid Sisters.

Splatoon 2: Octo Expansion

Despite having no major involvement in the single player campaign of the base game, Pearl and Marina would appear in the Octo Expansion in a major story role, where they communicate with the player-character Agent 8, an amnesiac Octoling. Players are able to read text chats between Pearl, Marina and the character Cap'n Cuttlefish. Pearl and Marina aid Agent 8 in getting to the surface area and assist in the final battle against the Telephone, who wishes to destroy the Inkling and Octoling species.

Merchandise and promotion
A two-pack amiibo set was released on July 13, 2018, featuring Pearl and Marina. Pearl and Marina received Sanrio-based plush toys of themselves.

Pearl and Marina performed in a virtual concert as part of the Splatoon European Championship. They later had a virtual concert at NicoNico Chokaigi 2018 where they performed the theme song of Splatoon 2: Octo Expansion, Nasty Majesty, which is the first time the song had been performed in full before.

In Super Smash Bros. Ultimate, they appear as a collectible spirit.

Reception
Pearl and Marina quickly became fan favorites after being revealed, receiving a number of fan works based on them. Polygon writer Allegra Frank and Destructoid writer Chris Moyse noted that Pearl was gremlin-like, which caused her to be more divisive than Marina who Frank said was "categorically beloved." Frank suggested that the divisiveness is due to the desire by Marina fans to "pump Marina up" as well as Pearl's attitude. She notes however that over time she had begun to grow in popularity, due in part to a rise in fan art of her. Moyse disagreed with the earlier assessment of Pearl, calling her "Queen of the World." Writer Jess Joho suggested that Marina's higher degree of popularity stems from her more revealing clothing and Pearl's younger appearance. Paste Magazine's Holly Green included Pearl and Marina in her list of the best new game characters of 2017. She was initially worried about whether they would be superior to Callie and Marie, but found herself enjoying them nonetheless. She felt that Marina was a better character than Pearl due to Pearl's eagerness and arrogance, but noted that an "effective frontwoman" needs those traits. She challenges readers to name a more iconic duo than them. Despite Electronic Gaming Monthly's Mollie L. Patterson love for Callie and Marie, she grew to prefer Pearl and Marina, and eventually came to appreciate Pearl as much as Marina. She also praised the chemistry and songs of the duo. Digital Trends' Gabe Gurwin noted that their popularity came from Marina's "cheery personality" and design and Pearl's "gangsta-rap chops." Callie and Marie were included on a Digital Trends list of the 10 characters they would like to see in Super Smash Bros. Ultimate. They were also included in Geek.com writer Will Greenwald's list of female characters he would like in Super Smash Bros. Ultimate, noting that he liked them both equally despite Marina being a fan favorite over Pearl.

Kotaku writer Heather Alexandra felt that Marina was "ruining" Splatfests due to Alexandra's inclination to pick a team not based on what she preferred, but rather on what team Marina was on. She states that she likes both, but Marina is "god tier." Electronic Gaming Monthly staff noted that Marina is "EGM's official queen" and that they would win every Splatfest for her. Writer Alex Perry suggested that Marina's side in the Splatfests would win due to how popular she is. Writer Jonathan Holmes praised Marina as being a good character for people of color (POC) to see themselves in as well as the first leading female POC Nintendo character. He also suggested that her being an Octoling, which he calls a minority group in Splatoon, enhances this. He also praised the design for not falling into tropes such as giving POC characters white hair. Geek.com writer Jordan Minor included Marina in his list of his favorite black Nintendo characters. Hardcore Gamer's Kirsten Swalley wished to have learned more about Marina's backstory and why she was a part of Inkopolis despite being an Octoling, and expressed an interest in a game that explored this.

The outfits worn by Pearl and Marina in Octo Expansion were speculated by fans and critics to be in reference to rappers The Notorious B.I.G. and Tupac Shakur, including US Gamer and Complex. When asked for clarification, Nogami chose to be mum on the issue, feeling that answering the question would take away from the mystery.

The relationship between Pearl and Marina has been subject to debate, with some people claiming that they are in a romantic relationship while others feel it's just a friendship. Writer Patricia Hernandez felt that the writing in the final Splatfest was leaning towards a romantic relationship but that it was vague enough to allow for either interpretation.

References

Splatoon
Anthropomorphic video game characters
Female characters in video games
Fictional cephalopods
Fictional duos
Fictional humanoids
Fictional singers
Nintendo characters
Nintendo protagonists
Fictional characters invented for recorded music
Singer characters in video games
Video game characters introduced in 2017
Japanese idols
Japanese popular culture
Teenage characters in video games